Bishop House may refer to:

India
Bishop House (Kolkata, India), a place of interest in Kolkata

Russia
Bishop House (Taganrog), a historic building in Taganrog, Rostov Oblast

United States
(by state)
Meigs-Bishop House, Madison, Connecticut, listed on the National Register of Historic Places (NRHP) in New Haven County
 Bishop House (Athens, Georgia), listed on the NRHP in Clarke County
 Bishop House (Falmouth, Kentucky), listed on the NRHP in Pendleton County
 Bishop House (New Brunswick, New Jersey), listed on the NRHP in Middlesex County
Coor-Bishop House, New Bern, North Carolina, listed on the NRHP in Craven County
McCormic-Bishop House, Paris, Texas, listed on the NRHP in Lamar County
 Bishop House (Graysontown, Virginia), listed on the NRHP in Montgomery County
 Bishop House (Casper, Wyoming), listed on the NRHP in Natrona County

See also
Bishops House (disambiguation), covers variations with "Bishop's", "Bishops'"